Warp X is a British film production company, sister to Warp Films based in Sheffield, UK with further offices in Nottingham and London. The company was founded in 2005 and produces feature films.

Company
Warp X was founded in 2005 and produces feature films. It is a digital film studio that produces feature films in the UK with budgets usually between £400,000 and £800,000. The studio serves as a format for new film directors to create movies for the first time on a lower budget scale with less expectation for high box office revenues on their initial feature foray.

The film studio began with support from organisations including Warp Films, Film4 Productions, the UK Film Council, EM Media, Screen Yorkshire and Optimum Releasing. The intent of the film studio's creation was to add energy and vitality to the film industry in Britain.

Filmography

References

External links 

Companies based in Sheffield
Companies established in 2005
Film production companies of the United Kingdom
Mass media in Sheffield